The final of the 2008–09 OFC Champions League was played between Auckland City FC of New Zealand and Koloale FC of the Solomon Islands.

The first match was played in the Lawson Tama Stadium in Honiara on April 25, 2009. The New Zealanders won 2–7.

The second match was played in Kiwitea Street, Auckland on May 3, 2009. The match finished 2–2, but Auckland City won 9–4 on aggregate and won the title.

 

|}

First leg

Second leg

References
OceaniaFootball

OFC Champions League finals